Joseph Bishop Keller (July 31, 1923 – September 7, 2016) was an American mathematician who specialized in applied mathematics. He was best known for his work on the "geometrical theory of diffraction" (GTD).

Early life and education
Born in Paterson, New Jersey on July 31, 1923, Keller attended Eastside High School, where he was a member of the math team. After earning his undergraduate degree in 1943 at New York University, Keller obtained his PhD in 1948 from NYU under the supervision of Richard Courant.  He was a Professor of Mathematics in the Courant Institute at New York University until 1979. Then he was Professor of Mathematics and Mechanical Engineering at Stanford University until 1993, when he became professor emeritus.

Research
Keller worked on the application of mathematics to problems in science and engineering, such as wave propagation.  He contributed to the Einstein–Brillouin–Keller method for computing eigenvalues in quantum mechanical systems.

Awards and honors
Keller was awarded a Lester R. Ford Award (shared with David W. McLaughlin) in 1976 and (not shared) in 1977. In 1988 he was awarded the U.S. National Medal of Science, and in 1997 he was awarded the Wolf Prize by the Israel-based Wolf Foundation.  In 1996, he was awarded the Nemmers Prize in Mathematics. In 1999 he was awarded the Ig Nobel Prize for calculating how to make a teapot spout that does not drip.    With Patrick B. Warren,  Robin C. Ball and Raymond E. Goldstein, Keller was awarded an Ig Nobel Prize in 2012 for calculating the forces that shape and move ponytail hair.
In 2012 he became a fellow of the American Mathematical Society.

Personal life
Keller's second wife, Alice S. Whittemore, started her career as a pure mathematician but shifted her interests to epidemiology and biostatistics.
Keller had a brother who was also a mathematician, Herbert B. Keller, who studied numerical analysis, scientific computing, bifurcation theory, path following and homotopy methods, and computational fluid dynamics. Herbert Keller was a professor at Caltech. Both brothers contributed to the fields of electromagnetics and fluid dynamics. Joseph Keller died in Stanford, California on September 7, 2016 from a recurrence of kidney cancer first diagnosed in 2003.

Major publications
 J.B. Keller. On solutions of Δu=f(u). Comm. Pure Appl. Math. 10 (1957), 503–510.
 Edward W. Larsen and Joseph B. Keller. Asymptotic solution of neutron transport problems for small mean free paths. J. Mathematical Phys. 15 (1974), 75–81.
 Joseph B. Keller and Dan Givoli. Exact nonreflecting boundary conditions. J. Comput. Phys. 82 (1989), no. 1, 172–192.
 Jacob Rubinstein, Peter Sternberg, and Joseph B. Keller. Fast reaction, slow diffusion, and curve shortening. SIAM J. Appl. Math. 49 (1989), no. 1, 116–133. 
 Marcus J. Grote and Joseph B. Keller. On nonreflecting boundary conditions. J. Comput. Phys. 122 (1995), no. 2, 231–243.
 Leonid Ryzhik, George Papanicolaou, and Joseph B. Keller. Transport equations for elastic and other waves in random media. Wave Motion 24 (1996), no. 4, 327–370.

References

External links 
 Official biography
 Curriculum vitae
 
 
 

1923 births
2016 deaths
Eastside High School (Paterson, New Jersey) alumni
People from Paterson, New Jersey
20th-century American mathematicians
21st-century American mathematicians
Jewish American scientists
Courant Institute of Mathematical Sciences faculty
Stanford University School of Engineering faculty
Foreign Members of the Royal Society
National Medal of Science laureates
Wolf Prize in Mathematics laureates
Courant Institute of Mathematical Sciences alumni
Members of the United States National Academy of Sciences
Fellows of the Society for Industrial and Applied Mathematics
Fellows of the American Mathematical Society
21st-century American Jews
Fellows of the American Physical Society